Shell Energy Stadium (formerly BBVA Compass Stadium, BBVA Stadium, then PNC Stadium) is an American multi-purpose stadium located in Houston, Texas that is home to the Houston Dynamo, a Major League Soccer club, the Houston Dash of the National Women's Soccer League, and Texas Southern Tigers football. The stadium is the result of combined commitments of $35.5 million from the city of Houston and $60 million from the Houston Dynamo. Harris County agreed to pay for half of the land in exchange for the ability to jointly own the stadium after its completion date in May 2012. The naming rights to the stadium were formely held by BBVA USA; the name was changed to that of PNC Financial Services due to BBVA's acquisition by PNC. The stadium's naming rights have been owned by Shell Energy since January 17, 2023.

The stadium is located on a tract of land bordered by Texas, Walker, Emancipation, and Hutchins in East Downtown and east of Interstate 69/U.S. Route 59 and Downtown Houston.

Construction history: 2009–2011
 
In June 2009, negotiations and financing began to fall into place with construction of the stadium originally beginning as early as Fall 2009. Banks and investors were in the books to finance the project and only minor details were being worked out. 
Various locations the Dynamo were interested in building a stadium since their arrival were the former Astroworld site, Pearland, Sugar Land, and Northeast Houston near the Lake Houston area.

On January 26, 2010, the Houston Dynamo franchise had expressed an interest in a proposed  parcel for the stadium location at South Rice Avenue and Westpark Drive—adjacent to Bellaire's city limits, and near the southwest corner of the Interstate 69/U.S. Highway 59 and the Interstate 610 interchanges. Two days later, the Mayor of Bellaire, Cindy Seigel said that she would use whatever power she could to oppose the possible new location and is in communication with the developer to dissuade him. She acknowledges that considering that the land is in Houston's city limits and only abuts her city, the odds are slim and said in an open letter to Midway:Fans on the north and east side of Houston will have difficulty in getting to this site. Additionally, this site does not have the infrastructure in place to serve it that already exists at other athletic facilities downtown or at Reliant Park.

The highly populated and heavily Hispanic area of Gulfton is within proximity, although former Council member Pam Holm stated that ethnic considerations should not be key to choosing a stadium location: "To position this as a Hispanic sport and say the stadium has to be in proximity to Hispanic neighborhoods doesn’t do it justice, the Dynamo is something that all citizens of Houston have so embraced."

On April 13, 2010, Harris County commissioners voted unanimously to begin construction of the new Dynamo stadium east of downtown, clearing the way for construction sometime in February 2011.

Oliver Luck, at the time president and general manager of the Dynamo, announced the financing, architect, and project manager for the new stadium. He announced Populous had been chosen to design and build the stadium. Populous, one of the world's leading sports architecture firms, had previously built three other major venues in the city—Minute Maid Park, NRG Stadium, and the Toyota Center, and internationally designed soccer stadia including Wembley Stadium (London), Emirates Stadium (London), Soccer City (Johannesburg), and Aviva Stadium (Dublin).

On February 5, 2011, the Houston Dynamo, led by Houston mayor Annise Parker and Harris County judge Ed Emmett, broke ground on the Houston Dynamo Stadium site. Houston Dynamo President Chris Canetti strongly expressed that the stadium will be ready by April 2012.

Milestones

Sports

Soccer

Construction on BBVA Stadium led to the Houston Dynamo's decision to play their first seven games of the 2012 Major League Soccer season on the road. Their first match at the stadium was played on May 12, 2012 when they defeated D.C. United 1–0. The lone goal came from Brad Davis from 35 yards out which beat D.C. goalkeeper Bill Hamid. The win happened in front of a capacity crowd of 22,039 and would mark the beginning of what would be an unbeaten year for the Dynamo at home, posting a year-end home record of 11–0–6.

After completion, BBVA Stadium became home to several international matches. The first was between New Zealand and El Salvador for the BBVA Compass Content Series on May 23, 2012. The match ended in a 2–2 draw. The first FIFA Qualifier match was played between Mexico and Guyana on October 12, 2012. Mexico won the match, 5–0.

The United States women's national team made its debut at the stadium with a 4–0 win over China PR on December 12, 2012. The United States men's national team played to a scoreless draw with Canada on January 29, 2013, in its BBVA debut.

Rugby union
BBVA Stadium played host to the 2012 Italian Tour of the Americas which saw the USA Eagles play Italy to a 30–10 loss. The Eagles returned to BBVA Compass Stadium to play a mid-year rugby union test match against Ireland on June 8, 2013; the Eagles lost 15–12, but set a record for largest crowd for the Eagles on home soil when 20,181 fans packed the stadium.

BBVA Stadium played host to the 2012–13 IRB Women's Sevens World Series in the USA leg of the series. However, the USA leg of the World Series was moved to the Atlanta suburb of Kennesaw, Georgia for the 2013–14 series, where it has remained ever since.

College football
BBVA Stadium is home to Texas Southern University football.  During the 2013 season, the stadium also hosted the Houston Cougars for two games while TDECU Stadium was being built. The Cougars drew the stadium's largest American football crowd—20,197 spectators—for a November 23 game against Cincinnati.

Gaelic football
BBVA Stadium played host to the first ever Gaelic football game on an MLS pitch August 3, 2014, when the Houston Gaels played the first of their now-annual demonstration match (divided squad) after the Houston Dynamo-D.C. United match.  The Gaels were originally scheduled to play on March 15 after the Dynamo-Montreal Impact match as part of the Saint Patrick's Day weekend festivities, but the game was postponed due to concerns about the rain-soaked pitch.

Features and design

The stadium has a capacity of 22,039 seats, including 34 private suites, 1,100 club seats, Premium Club, dedicated supporters stand, and food court. The stadium is designed to accommodate MLS and FIFA standard international soccer, football, lacrosse, rugby, and concerts.

Architecturally, the stadium features a faceted facade of expanded metal mesh with orange polycarbonate enclosed entrances and spectator facilities that reflects the industrial heritage of the East Downtown location.  The stadium architect, Christopher Lee of Populous, stated, “We set out to design the perfect urban soccer stadium: tight, atmospheric, and intimate.” Lee was the designer of the famed Emirates Stadium in London, England, and his design brings European stadium traditions of intimate and atmospheric soccer specific stadia to MLS. The $95 million stadium construction cost makes the BBVA Compass Stadium the most cost-effective of modern soccer-specific stadiums, with recent venues like the Red Bull Arena costing $200 million, Rio Tinto Stadium costing $110 million, and PPL Park costing $115 million.

Sponsors
On December 13, 2011, BBVA Compass, an international bank with dozens of branches in Houston, signed a 10-year, $20 million naming rights deal. The stadium was renamed to "BBVA Stadium" on June 13, 2019, as part of the company's brand changes.

During the second half of the 2021 season, BBVA Stadium was rebranded as PNC Stadium following PNC Financial Services' acquisition of BBVA USA in June 2021. 

Shell Energy announced on January 17, 2023 that it acquired the stadium's naming rights, agreeing to a 8 year, $40 million deal.

Awards

On December 10, 2012, BBVA Compass Stadium received the Leadership in Energy and Environmental Design Silver certification from the U.S. Green Building Council.

The stadium received the award for its innovative construction and sustainable design. Notable achievements during the stadium's construction process included diverting 86.85% of on-site generated construction waste to landfills, reducing water use by 41% from the installation of high-energy toilets, reducing energy use by 20.41%, using 98.42% of the wood-based building materials from certified forests and providing preferred parking spaces for fuel-efficient low-emissions vehicles.

Concessions
On March 22, 2012, AEG Facilities-managed BBVA Compass and the Houston Dynamo announced that Levy Restaurants will be the official restaurant partner.

Stadium partners
The following are its current official stadium partners:
 Budweiser
 Audi
 Papa Johns 
 Life Storage
 AT&T
 TriEagle Energy

Accessibility and transportation

The stadium is adjacent to METRORail light rail at EaDo/Stadium station, served by the Green and Purple lines. Taxi, Buses, street, and garage parking nearby. The stadium is located southeast of Minute Maid Park—within the East Downtown district (which is undergoing revitalization efforts) and east of Downtown Houston.

International matches
BBVA Stadium hosted its first international match on May 23, 2012, when New Zealand and El Salvador played to a 2–2 draw. The stadium hosted its first women's international match when it hosted a 4–0 win by the United States over China in December 2012.

Men's matches

Women's matches

Rugby union

See also
 List of NCAA Division I FCS football stadiums
 List of soccer stadiums in the United States

References

External links

BBVA Stadium at StadiumDB.com

Houston Dynamo FC
Major League Soccer stadiums
Sports venues in Houston
American football venues in Houston
College football venues
Soccer venues in Houston
National Women's Soccer League stadiums
Rugby union stadiums in Houston
CONCACAF Gold Cup stadiums
Houston Christian Huskies football
Texas Southern Tigers football
Sports venues completed in 2012
2012 establishments in Texas